Daniel Norman Dorion (born March 2, 1963) is an American former professional ice hockey right winger who played four games with the New Jersey Devils of the National Hockey League (NHL) between 1985–86 and 1987–88. The rest of his career, which lasted from 1986 to 1995, was mainly spent in the minor American Hockey League and in Europe. Internationally Dorion played for the American national team at the 1985 World Championship.

Dorion played college hockey for Western Michigan University. In 1986 he placed second in voting for the Hobey Baker Award, when he led the NCAA in scoring. Dorion was the 1986 CCHA player of the year.

Career statistics

Regular season and playoffs

International

Awards and honors

References

External links

1963 births
Living people
American men's ice hockey right wingers
Humberside Seahawks players
Ice hockey players from New York (state)
Maine Mariners players
New Jersey Devils draft picks
New Jersey Devils players
Nottingham Panthers players
People from Astoria, Queens
Roanoke Express players
SHC Fassa players
Sportspeople from Queens, New York
Utica Devils players
Western Michigan Broncos men's ice hockey players
AHCA Division I men's ice hockey All-Americans